April 2016

See also

References

 04
April 2016 events in the United States